Helen Lewis was a Canadian film editor who worked in the British film industry in the 1920s through the 1940s; early on in her career, she frequently worked with director Josef von Sternberg. Her first known credit was on 1928's The Dragnet. Her date of death is unknown.

Selected filmography 

 Mother and Her Child (1947)
 Coal Face, Canada (1943) 
 Talk of the Devil (1936)
 Lady in Danger (1934)
 Turkey Time (1933)
 A Cuckoo in the Nest (1933)
 Wives Beware (1932)
 Thunderbolt (1929)
 The Case of Lena Smith (1929)
 The Docks of New York (1928)
 The Dragnet (1928)

References

External links 

 

Canadian film editors
Canadian women film editors
1898 births
Year of death missing
Canadian expatriates in the United Kingdom